James River High School may refer to:

James River High School (Buchanan, Virginia) in Botetourt County, Virginia
James River High School (Chesterfield County, Virginia) in Chesterfield County, Virginia
James River Christian Academy in Smithfield, Virginia

See also 
 James River, for which all three schools are named
 James River (disambiguation)
 James River Bridge